The 1988 Los Angeles Cobras season was the first and only season for the Cobras.

On March 16, 1988, it was announced that team would be nicknamed the Cobras, as well as the introduction of head coach Ray Willsey. The Cobras played their home games at the Los Angeles Sports Arena, which they shared with the Los Angeles Clippers of the National Basketball Association. The team's logo consisted of an interlocking "LA" in which the left upright of the "A" was formed by the hooded head and "neck" of a cobra.

The team debuted April 30, 1988, against the New York Knights. The Cobras started the season 0-3, but finished the season 5-3-1, clinching a playoff spot.

Despite a lineup that featured former NFL all-pro receiver Cliff Branch, ex-UCLA quarterback Matt Stevens and future Arena Football Hall of Fame Gary Mullen, Los Angeles drew dismal crowds: just 7,507 per game, second-worst in the AFL. The Cobras lost in the semifinals to the Chicago Bruisers, 29-16. It turned out to be their last game ever as the Cobras (as well as the New York Knights and the New England Steamrollers) folded after the 1988 season, temporarily cutting the league down to just three teams.

Regular season

Schedule

Standings

Playoffs

Roster

Awards

References

Los Angeles Cobras Season, 1988
Los Angeles Cobras